Florence  Akinwale is a female politician from Ekiti State, Nigeria.

Career 
Akinwale represented the Emure/Gbenyi/Ekiti East Federal constituency  at the Nigerian national assembly from 2007 to 2011 under the People's Democratic party platform.

References 

Living people
Ekiti State politicians
Nigerian women in politics
Year of birth missing (living people)